Michael Tate Westbrook is an officer in the United States Navy who served as commanding officer of the USS Spruance (DDG-111) from May 2010 to May 2012. Prior to this, he served in the Pentagon on the Naval Operations Staff's Programming Division from fall 2007 through June 2009.

Career
Westbrook's initial sea tours were in USS Hawes (FFG-53) as Communications Officer, Ordnance Officer and Weapons Control Officer, and included combat action in Operation Desert Shield and Operation Desert Storm. In 1993, he resigned from active duty to pursue a career as a small business entrepreneur in Charleston, South Carolina, during which time he also achieved a U.S. Coast Guard Merchant Master's license. He returned to active duty in 1997 and eventually served as Combat Systems Officer in USS O'Brien (DD-975), then later served as the commissioning Combat Systems Officer in USS McCampbell (DDG-85).

He then served at the Missile Defense Agency as the Aegis Ballistic Missile Defense Program Support Officer in 2003, and as the Missile Defense Agency's liaison to the United States House Appropriations Subcommittee on Defense from 2004 through 2005. He then served as Executive Officer in USS Laboon (DDG-58), one of the three ships of the first Atlantic Fleet Destroyer Sea Swap experiment.

In 2007, he was one of the 30 selected as National Finalists in the White House Fellows program. He represented the Navy as a 2008-2009 Fellow in the Massachusetts Institute of Technology Seminar XXI program.

Westbrook commanded the Navy task force that launched the 2017 Shayrat missile strike in response to the Khan Shaykhun chemical attack in Syria.

Military awards

Personal life
Westbrook is a native of Murfreesboro, Tennessee. He holds a bachelor's degree in rhetoric from Tulane University and a Master of Business Administration from Southern New Hampshire University.

References

External links
 

Living people
Year of birth missing (living people)
Place of birth missing (living people)
People from Murfreesboro, Tennessee
Tulane University alumni
United States Navy officers
Southern New Hampshire University alumni